Shahbaz is a Persian word referring to the fabled guardian bird Shahbaz.

Shahbaz, Shabaz or Shehbaz may refer to:

People with the given name
Shahbaz Bhatti (1968–2011), Christian Pakistani politician
 Shahbaz Khan (actor) (born 1966), formerly Haider Amir, Indian actor
 Shahbaz Khan (cricketer) (born 1991), Pakistani cricketer
 Shahbaz Khan (hydrologist), Australian climatologist and hydrologist
Shahbaz Khan Bugti, tribal chief in Balochistan
Shahbaz Khan Kamboh (1529–1599), Mughal general of Akbar
Shehbaz Sharif, Pakistani politician
Shahbaz Tariq (born 1948), Norwegian politician
Shahbaz Ali (Born 1982), Pakistani Graphic Designer

People with the surname
General Shahbaz Khan Kamboh (1529–1599), Mughal Empire general
Parsegh Shahbaz (1883–1915), Ottoman Armenian lawyer, political activist, journalist, and columnist
Hafizullah Shabaz Khail, Afghan prisoner in US detention at Guantanamo Bay, Cuba
John C. Shabaz (1931–2012), United States federal judge
Lal Shahbaz Qalandar (1177–1274), Sufi saint, philosopher and poet
Michael Shabaz (born 1987), American tennis player
Muhammad Shahbaz (born 1972), Pakistani hockey player
Philip Shahbaz, American actor

Places
Dakshin Shahbazpur Union, union council in Moulvibazar district, Bangladesh
Dasht Shahbaz, historical place in Balochistan province, Pakistan
Shahbaz Azmat Khel, town in Khyber-Pakhtunkhwa, Pakistan
Shahbaz Garhi, historic site in Khyber-Pakhtunkhwa, Pakistan
Shahbaz Khel, village in Khyber-Pakhtunkhwa, Pakistan

Other uses
 Shahbazpur (disambiguation), list of places named after the word/name Shahbaz
 Shahbaz FC, an association football club associated with Shahin Tehran F.C.
Hajj Shahbazkhan Mosque, Kermanshah, Iran
Shahbaz (bird), mythological bird
Shabaz (band), American qawwali band

Indian masculine given names
Pakistani masculine given names